is a train station in Takaharu, Nishimorokata District, Miyazaki Prefecture, Japan. It is operated by JR Kyushu and is on the Kitto Line.

Lines

Layout 
The station consists of a side platform serving a single track at grade. There is no station building, only a shelter on the platform for waiting passengers. A bike shed is provided near the station entrance by the side of the access road.

Adjacent stations

History
Japanese Government Railways (JGR) opened the station on 1 October 1961 as an additional station on the existing track of the Kitto Line. With the privatization of Japanese National Railways (JNR), the successor of JGR, on 1 April 1987, the station came under the control of JR Kyushu.

Passenger statistics
In fiscal 2016, the station was used by an average of 17 passengers (boarding only) per day.

See also
List of railway stations in Japan

References

External links

  

Railway stations in Miyazaki Prefecture
Railway stations in Japan opened in 1961